Luca Franchini (born 31 December 1983) is a retired Italian footballer who played as a defender. He is currently a youth coach at Brentford.

Career
Franchini started his career at Internazionale at age of 8. He started to play as a left back and turned to centre back in 2001, as the team had Giovanni Pasquale. He won the Primavera League title in 2002. In 2002–03 season, he succeed Nicola Beati as Primavera team captain which Beati was promoted to first team. Franchini led the team entered the League playoffs final, but lost to Lecce in 2–3.

He also made 2 official appearances for Inter first team in 2002–03 season, one at Serie A, one at Coppa Italia.

In summer 2003, he graduated from youth team and loaned to Padova of Serie C1.

In August 2004, he was on loan to Ascoli along with Isah Eliakwu.

Due to fail to enter the first team, in January 2005, he was on loan to Vis Pesaro 1898, but changed to Ancona of Serie C2 on 31 January 2005, the last day of the transfer window.

In summer 2005, he was sold to Pro Patria of Serie C1. A year later, Mantova of Serie B bought him from Pro Patria and signed a 3-year contract In the first season he just played 9 starts in 10 league appearances. In the next season, he played more regular with 19 starts.

He joined Gallipoli Calcio in August 2009. On 26 January 2011 signed with FC Südtirol.

References

External links
Inter Archive
http://aic.football.it/scheda/12827/franchini-luca.htm
Profile at FIGC 
http://www.gazzetta.it/Speciali/serie_b_2007/giocatori/franchini_luc.shtml
http://www.gazzetta.it/speciali/serie_b/2008_nw/giocatori/73017.shtml

Italian footballers
Italy youth international footballers
Inter Milan players
Calcio Padova players
Ascoli Calcio 1898 F.C. players
A.C. Ancona players
Aurora Pro Patria 1919 players
Mantova 1911 players
A.S.D. Gallipoli Football 1909 players
F.C. Südtirol players
Serie A players
Serie B players
Serie C players
Footballers from Milan
Association football defenders
1983 births
Living people